The Guam national rugby sevens team competed at the 2009 Hong Kong Sevens. They participated at the 2015 Pacific Games in Papua New Guinea.

Players

Previous Squads 
Squad to 2015 Pacific Games:
Christopher Sgro
Robert Leon Guerrero
Brian Ramiro
Edward Calvo
Gerard Aguon
Vinson Calvo
Paul Eustaquio
Sixto Quintanilla III
Jesse Perez
Johnny Borga
Ezra Sablan
Christopher Wintterie

2009 Sevens RWC Qualifier: Asia

Group D

See also
 Rugby union in Guam
 Guam national rugby union team (XV)

References
 

National rugby sevens teams
Rugby union in Guam
Guam national rugby union team
National sports teams of Guam